Ash Creek is a stream in Rock County, Minnesota, in the United States. It is a tributary of the Rock River.

Ash Creek was named from the white ash trees lining its banks.

See also
List of rivers of Minnesota

References

Rivers of Rock County, Minnesota
Rivers of Minnesota